Mungo MacCallum is the name of four prominent Australians (four consecutive generations of the same family).  They are:
 Mungo William MacCallum (1854–1942), Professor of Modern Literature, Vice Chancellor and Chancellor of the University of Sydney, father of
 Mungo Lorenz MacCallum (1884–1934), son of Mungo William MacCallum, Rhodes Scholar, lectured in Roman Law at University of Sydney; writer & book reviewer
 Mungo Ballardie MacCallum (1913–1999), journalist with the Sydney Morning Herald and also ABC, producing its opening night of television in 1956
 Mungo Wentworth MacCallum (1941–2020), son of Mungo Ballardie MacCallum and Diana Wentworth; political journalist and author